Hewitt is an unincorporated community in Swain County, North Carolina, United States. Hewitt is located along US 74, West of Bryson City and East of Topton.

A talc and limestone mine is located in Hewitt.

References

External links
 USGS: Hewitt
 Travel Western North Carolina: Hewitt, WCU Digital Collections

Unincorporated communities in Swain County, North Carolina
Communities of the Great Smoky Mountains
Unincorporated communities in North Carolina